TÜBİTAK Defense Industries Research and Development Institute, shortly TÜBİTAK SAGE, is a Turkish institution carrying out research and development projects on defense industry technology.

It was established in 1972 at Beşevler neighborhood in central Ankara under the name "Guided Vehicles Technology and Measurement Center" (Güdümlü Araçlar Teknoloji ve Ölçüm Merkezi, GATÖM) by the Scientific and Technological Research Council of Turkey (TÜBİTAK). In 1983, the institution was renamed to "Ballistics Research Institute" (Balistik Araştırma Enstitüsü, BAE), and finally in 1988 it took its current name. The organization conducts research and development activities to meet the needs of the Turkish Armed Forces and national defense industry.

The facility in Beşevler serves as Ankara Wind Tunnel. The institute also runs a site within the Middle East Technical University (ODTÜ).

Projects
SOM cruise missile
The Stand-off Missile (SOM) is a high-precision long-range cruise missile, which can be launched from land, sea and air platforms.	

Certification efforts are in progress to enable the SOM missile for integration with both Turkish Air Force F-35 Lightning II and NATO allied F-35.

HGK guidance kit

The HGK guidance kit (HGK) is a GPS/INS guidance kit with flap out wings that converts 2000-lb Mark 84 bombs into smart weapons. It enables precision strike talent

KGK smart wing adapter kit

The KGK guidance kit (KGK) a precision guidance wing kit that converts 1000-lb Mark 83 bombs and 500-lb Mark 82 bombs into long range fire-and-forget smart weapons.

TOROS artillery rocket system
The TOROS artillery rocket system (TOROS) is an artillery rocket system consisting of both 230 and 260 mm caliber rockets fired from a launcher vehicle.

Thermal battery

NEB bunker buster

The NEB Bunker Buster (NEB) is a bomb able to destroy the reinforced concrete fixed and buried targets by penetrating to them with desired time delay. It is compatible with HGK and GBU-10 Paveway II.

Under development Projects
GÖKTUĞ
The GÖKTUĞ is a Turkish program to develop two indigenous Air to air missiles, the Gökdoğan(Peregrine) and Bozdoğan (Merlin). The Peregrin will be a WVRAAM(With in visual range air to air missile) with an IIR(Imaging Infrared) seeker while Merlin will be a  BVRAAM(Beyond Visual Range Air to Air missile) equipped with an Active radar seeker

References

External links

1972 establishments in Turkey
Research institutes established in 1972
Organizations based in Ankara
Middle East Technical University
Research institutes in Turkey
Scientific and Technological Research Council of Turkey
Military research of Turkey
Guided missile manufacturers